Quincy is a village in Branch County in the U.S. state of Michigan.  The population was 1,652 at the 2010 census.

The village is located within Quincy Township on U.S. Highway 12. Note: there is also another Quincy Township in Houghton County.

Geography
The ZIP code is 49082 and the FIPS place code is 66640.

Notable people
 Scott Barry, current MLB umpire
 Jill Dobson, television journalist for CBS, former Miss Michigan and former entertainment correspondent for Fox News Channel
 Samuel Etheridge, one of Michigan's first state senators, representing the Seventh Senatorial District from 1838 to 1840
 Bessie B. Kanouse, mycologist
 Jane Murfin, playwright and screenwriter
 Hope Rippey, convicted murderer of Shanda Sharer

Demographics

2010 census
As of the census of 2010, there were 1,652 people, 634 households, and 436 families living in the village. The racial makeup of the village was 96.9% White, 0.5% African American, 0.2% Native American, 0.4% Asian, 0.6% from other races, and 1.3% from two or more races. Hispanic or Latino of any race were 2.5% of the population.

There were 634 households, of which 40.5% had children under the age of 18 living with them, 41.5% were married couples living together, 18.9% had a female householder with no husband present, 8.4% had a male householder with no wife present, and 31.2% were non-families. 25.1% of all households were made up of individuals, and 7.7% had someone living alone who was 65 years of age or older. The average household size was 2.61 and the average family size was 3.02.

The median age in the village was 33.1 years. 29.6% of residents were under the age of 18; 10.3% were between the ages of 18 and 24; 25.5% were from 25 to 44; 26.5% were from 45 to 64; and 8.2% were 65 years of age or older. The gender makeup of the village was 49.4% male and 50.6% female.

2000 census
As of the census of 2000, there were 1,701 people, 640 households, and 435 families living in the village. The racial makeup of the village was 97.24% White, 0.29% African American, 0.24% Native American, 0.24% Asian, 0.18% Pacific Islander, 1.18% from other races, and 0.65% from two or more races. Hispanic or Latino of any race were 2.35% of the population.

There were 640 households, out of which 41.6% had children under the age of 18 living with them, 45.0% were married couples living together, 17.3% had a female householder with no husband present, and 31.9% were non-families. 26.3% of all households were made up of individuals, and 8.1% had someone living alone who was 65 years of age or older.  The average household size was 2.61 and the average family size was 3.10.

In the village, the population was spread out, with 31.5% under the age of 18, 9.8% from 18 to 24, 29.1% from 25 to 44, 19.9% from 45 to 64, and 9.7% who were 65 years of age or older.  The median age was 32 years. For every 100 females, there were 95.3 males.  For every 100 females age 18 and over, there were 91.6 males.

The median income for a household in the village was $35,987, and the median income for a family was $38,839. Males had a median income of $29,602 versus $22,188 for females. The per capita income for the village was $15,951.  About 8.6% of families and 10.6% of the population were below the poverty line, including 13.4% of those under age 18 and 14.1% of those age 65 or over.

Transportation

US Highways

References

Villages in Branch County, Michigan
Villages in Michigan